Camp Ground is an unincorporated community in Mount Vernon Township, Jefferson County, Illinois, United States.

References

Unincorporated communities in Jefferson County, Illinois
Unincorporated communities in Illinois